The Ballou House is an historic house on Albion Road in Lincoln, Rhode Island, USA. It is a 2½ story wood-frame structure, five bays wide, with a large central chimney. A single-story gable-roof wing (estimated to be 19th century in origin) extends to the east, and a 20th-century gambrel-roofed ell extends to the north. The house was probably built c. 1782 by Moses Ballou, from one of the first families to settle in the area, and was owned by his descendants through most of the 19th century.

The house was listed on the National Register of Historic Places on August 30, 1984.

See also
National Register of Historic Places listings in Providence County, Rhode Island

References

Houses completed in 1782
Houses on the National Register of Historic Places in Rhode Island
Federal architecture in Rhode Island
Houses in Lincoln, Rhode Island
National Register of Historic Places in Providence County, Rhode Island
1782 establishments in Rhode Island